Diophantine means pertaining to the ancient Greek mathematician Diophantus.  A number of concepts bear this name:

Diophantine approximation
Diophantine equation
Diophantine quintuple
Diophantine set